Parwane is a Bollywood action film released in 1993 starring Avinash Wadhavan, Siddharth, Shilpa Shirodkar and Paresh Rawal. The story is written by Tanveer Khan and music is composed by Anand–Milind.

Plot 

Pune-based Police Inspector Basheer Khan warns four Gokhale College's trouble-makers, Avinash Malhotra, Henry D'Souza, Avtar Singh, and Aslam, to behave themselves after he witnesses them molesting a girl, and getting into fisticuffs with some men who tried to stop them. The foursome successfully pass their exams and return to their respective homes - little knowing that soon they will be thrown into conflict with not only Basheer Khan, who has been transferred to Bombay, but also with Sub-Inspectors Tawde and Damodar; and that two of them are fated to die violent deaths, and the remainder of the two may face the death penalty for homicide.

Cast

Siddharth Ray - Henry D'Souza
Shilpa Shirodkar - Mona S. Saxena
Avinash Wadhavan-Avinash Malhotra
Varsha Usgaonkar-Suzie
Paresh Rawal-Naag Reddy
Gulshan Grover-Rama N. Reddy
Ajinkya Deo-Aslam
Tinnu Anand-D'Souza

Soundtrack
The music of the film is composed by Anand–Milind and lyrics are penned by Sameer.

Release
The film was well received by critics.

References

External links

1993 films
1990s Hindi-language films
Films scored by Anand–Milind